Albert J. "Cozy" Dolan (born James Alberts, December 23, 1882 – December 10, 1958) was a Major League Baseball player. The , 160-pound outfielder and third baseman played for six teams; the Cincinnati Reds (1909), the New York Highlanders (1911–1912), the Philadelphia Phillies (1912–1913), the Pittsburgh Pirates (1913), the St. Louis Cardinals (1914–1915) and the New York Giants (1922). Over his career he posted career numbers of 299 hits, 210 runs, 102 stolen bases, a .339 Slugging percentage, and a .252 batting average.

In the final series of the 1924 season, the Giants were playing the Philadelphia Phillies at the Polo Grounds and battling for the pennant with the Brooklyn Dodgers. Giants outfielder Jimmy O'Connell offered Phillies shortstop Heinie Sand $500 to throw the games. Sand rejected the bribe and reported it to Phillies manager Art Fletcher. It eventually led to the lifetime suspension of O'Connell and Dolan, who was a coach for the Giants, by Commissioner Landis, although future-Hall of Famers Frankie Frisch, George Kelly, and Ross Youngs were also implicated.

Personal life

Dolan was born in Oshkosh, Wisconsin on December 23, 1889 to James T. and Bridget (Joyce) Dolan. He was the youngest of 7 children. His birth record indicates he was named Alvin, but a 1911 newspaper report says, "Albert J Dolan, commonly known and called as Alvin Dolan... ." He records his name as Albert James Dolan on his World War I draft registration card.

On January 2, 1907, Albert J. Dolan married Georgia Simpson, daughter of Douglas J. and Mary (Abrams) Simpson, in Oshkosh, Wisconsin. The couple frequently wintered in Oshkosh during Cozy's off season. This tendency is evidenced by articles such as the following:

"Mr. and Mrs. Albert J. Dolan have returned to Oshkosh to spend the winter in this city. They will reside at the home of Mr. and Mrs. Douglas Simpson, 1316 South Main street. Mr. Dolan is a member of the New York American league baseball team" (The Daily Northwestern [Oshkosh, Wisconsin], 10 Oct 1911).

The city of Oshkosh was very proud of their native son and local papers assiduously followed his career. Articles such as the following were common:

"PLAYS WINNING BALL. 
Alvin Dolan Makes Home Run and Brings Victory to Jersey City Over Newark.

Alvin Dolan, the Oshkosh young man who formerly played with the Oshkosh team in the Wisconsin state league and the W-1 league, and is now playing third base with Jersey City in the Eastern league, makes the eastern fans sit up by clouting the ball."

The article continues to describe a specific game and touts Alvin's prowess. Another article shows some of Cozy Dolan's personality when he joined the bowlers team of Oshkosh's Elks Lodge when they competed in a state tournament in 1915. A review of the tournament in The Daily Northwestern (an Oshkosh newspaper) includes the following Cozy Dolan antics:

"A feature of the Oshkosh expedition to the tournament was a concert by the Arions of this city at the Hotel Beaumont, Green Bay, at supper-time Saturday. They played in the lobby for an hour, under the direction of Albert J. Dolan, the Oshkosh baseball star who plays left field for the St. Louis Cardinals. The name "Cozy Dolan" was changed to "Dazy Colan" for the time being, and the ball-player-bowler-comedian literally brought down the house with his skillful interpretations of the wiles and arts of bandmaster. With all the magnetic directive powers of a John Philip Sousa, all the grace of a D'Urbando, "Dozy Colan" led the Arions in an artistic concert" (The Daily Northwestern (Oshkosh, Wisconsin), 25 Jan 1915).

Cozy Dolan died December 8, 1958 in his hometown of Chicago.

References

External links

1880s births
1958 deaths
Major League Baseball outfielders
New York Highlanders players
St. Louis Cardinals players
New York Giants (NL) players
New York Giants (NL) coaches
Pittsburgh Pirates players
Cincinnati Reds players
Philadelphia Phillies players
Minor league baseball managers
Oshkosh Indians players
La Crosse Pinks players
Rockford Reds players
Denver Grizzlies (baseball) players
Jersey City Skeeters players
Rochester Hustlers players
Indianapolis Indians players
Sportspeople from Oshkosh, Wisconsin
Baseball players from Wisconsin
Baseball players from Chicago